"Me and the Devil Blues" is a blues song by Robert Johnson. It tells the story of the singer's waking up one morning to the devil knocking on the door, telling him that "it's time to go".

The lyrics concluded with the lines "You may bury my body down by the highway side" / "So my old evil spirit can catch a Greyhound bus and ride." Johnson recorded the song, among others, in a warehouse in Dallas, that served as a makeshift recording studio, on June 19, 1937.  It was his final recording session.

References

1930 songs
Blues songs
Songs written by Robert Johnson
Robert Johnson songs
Song recordings produced by Don Law